Peter van Paassen (born 20 December 1978) is a former Dutch basketball player. Van Paassen played for multiple teams in Belgium, Spain and the Netherlands. Standing at 6 ft 11 in (2.11 m), he usually played as center. Van Paassen has won the Dutch MVP award two times, which makes him one of the few Dutch players to ever win the award. On 20 August 2013, Van Paassen announced his retirement.

International career
Van Paassen played 64 games for the Dutch national basketball team in his career.

References

1978 births
Living people
Dutch basketball coaches
Amsterdam Basketball players
BC Oostende players
Belfius Mons-Hainaut players
Centers (basketball)
Heroes Den Bosch players
Den Helder Kings players
Dutch Basketball League players
Dutch expatriate basketball people in Spain
Dutch expatriate basketball people in the United States
Dutch men's basketball players
Melilla Baloncesto players
Sportspeople from The Hague
St. Bonaventure Bonnies men's basketball players